The Second Parliament of Ontario was in session from March 21, 1871, until December 23, 1874, just prior to the 1875 general election. The majority party was the Ontario Liberal Party  led by Edward Blake; Oliver Mowat replaced Blake as premier in October 1872. An act was passed in 1872 which prohibited a member from holding a seat in the Legislative Assembly while holding a seat in the Dominion Parliament, a so-called "dual mandate". There were 88 members in the second legislature.

Richard William Scott served as speaker for the assembly until he was named to cabinet on December 21, 1871. James George Currie succeeded Scott as speaker, serving until his resignation on March 29, 1873. Rupert Mearse Wells then succeeded Currie as speaker.

Notes

References 
A History of Ontario : its resources and development., Alexander Fraser

02
1871 establishments in Ontario
1874 disestablishments in Ontario